Lucas Local School District is a public school district serving students in the village of Lucas, most of Monroe Township, eastern parts of Washington Township, and southern parts of Mifflin Township in Richland County, Ohio, United States. The school district enrolls 584 students as of the 2007–2008 academic year.

Schools

Elementary schools
Lucas Elementary School (Grades K through 5th)
425 students

Middle schools
Lucas Heritage Middle School (Grades 6th and 7th)

High schools
Lucas High School (Grades 8th through 12th)

References

External links
Lucas Local School District official website

Education in Richland County, Ohio
School districts in Ohio